Senator Dupre or Dupré may refer to:

Reggie Dupre (born 1957), Louisiana State Senate
Jacques Dupré (1773–1846), Louisiana State Senate